Anuchino is a rural locality (a selo) and the administrative center of Anuchinsky District of Primorsky Krai, Russia, located on the right bank of the Arsenyevka River, near its confluence with the Muraveyka River. Population:

History
It was founded in 1880.

References

Rural localities in Primorsky Krai
Populated places established in 1880
1880 establishments in the Russian Empire